Anykšta is a river of Anykščiai district municipality, Utena County, northeastern Lithuania. It flows for 13.8 kilometres and has a basin area of 144.9 km².

It is a left tributary of the Šventoji in the town Anykščiai.

The name Anykšta is of unknown origin. According to one theory it could be derived from Proto-Indoeuropean root *an-/*en- related to water.

References

LIETUVOS RESPUBLIKOS UPIŲ IR TVENKINIŲ KLASIFIKATORIUS (Republic of Lithuania- River and Pond Classifications).  Ministry of Environment (Lithuania). Accessed 2011-11-11.

Rivers of Lithuania
Anykščiai District Municipality